Stingray Point is a small community on the Chesapeake Bay near the village of Deltaville in Middlesex County, Virginia. It is located at the eastern terminus of State Route 33. It is populated by fewer than 250 full-time residents; however, during summer months that population surges as tourists and vacationers flock to Deltaville for recreation on the bay. Most of the houses on Stingray Point are cottages and weekend homes. Stingray Point is also home to Stingray Point Marina, one of the Deltaville area's many marinas.

Stingray Point gets its name from the 17th century when Captain John Smith was stung while fishing with his men off a shoal near the point by a Cownose Ray. Smith was seriously injured by the sting, and even gave orders to his men as to the disposal of his body should he perish. Treated with hot compresses, he recovered well enough by evening that he dined on the ray. Local legend records that he was saved by a mudpack derived from mud found at a nearby creek and administered by a native medicine man; the creek has since been known as Antipoison Creek.

References

Unincorporated communities in Middlesex County, Virginia
Unincorporated communities in Virginia
Virginia populated places on the Chesapeake Bay